A racino is a combined race track and casino.  In some cases, the gambling is limited to slot machines, but many locations are beginning to include table games such as blackjack, poker, and roulette.

In 2003, Joe Bob Briggs described the economic motivation of race track owners to convert into racinos:
Horse racing and dog racing have been in a slow decline for almost 20 years now....the only tracks that have really thrived are the ones that have slot machines. In many cases their live handle (the daily amount bet at the track by live customers) has continued to decline, but their revenues have shot up so fast that they're able to offer the biggest purses and thereby attract the best horses. Tracks like Delaware Park and West Virginia's Mountaineer Park, once considered places where local degenerates bet on broken-down nags in claiming races, are now among the wealthiest tracks around, with the best races. Fabled tracks like Pimlico, on the other hand, sometimes have trouble making ends meet.

In the United States
USA Today noted in a June 2003 article that receipts from slot machines are divided about evenly in four ways:
 Payment of the operating costs and payouts to lucky gamblers,
 State taxes,
 Prize money (the purse) offered to jockeys and horse owners, and
 Profit for the racino operator.

As of 2013, racinos are legal in ten U.S. states: Delaware, Louisiana, Maine, New Mexico, New York, Ohio, Oklahoma, Pennsylvania, Rhode Island, and West Virginia. The first racino in Pennsylvania opened in November 2006. West Virginia pioneered the concept when MTR Gaming Group was allowed to introduce video lottery terminals (VLTs) to the venue now known as Mountaineer Casino, Racetrack and Resort in Chester. Delaware, Rhode Island, and West Virginia, three of the members of the Multi-State Lottery Association (MUSL), jointly ran a progressive VLT game, Ca$hola, from 2006 to July 2011; the three lotteries began offering Ca$hola's successor, MegaHits, on July 15, 2011.

While VLTs were somewhat successful, a November 2003 article from the Global Gaming Insider noted the real financial success story was the introduction of reel spinning slot machines in Iowa:
In 1994, Iowa voters authorized reel spinning slot machines at Iowa racetracks (including Greyhound tracks).  Polk County, the owner of a brand new, bankrupt horse track, Prairie Meadows, spent $26 million to convert the clubhouse into a casino and install 1,100 slot machines.  The racino opened for business on April 1, 1995.  Reel-spinning slots proved to be much more popular than video poker.  In the twelve months ended March 31, 1996 machine revenues totaled $119.3 million, enabling Polk County to pay off the $27 million bond issue that paid for the clubhouse casino conversion and retire the track's initial $38.8 million bond issue 17 years early.

As the racino had increased revenues, horse racing purses increased six-fold, which attracted better horses to the racetrack and helped to develop horse breeding in Iowa.

The Global Gaming Insider article also noted that the creation of the racino has led to consolidation in the ownership of racetracks, with Magna Entertainment Corporation (currently Stronach Group) and Churchill Downs Incorporated the largest.

In November 2004, Florida voters amended their state constitution to allow slot machines at parimutuel facilities.

In Bangor, Maine,  a $131 million complex is under construction that will house, among other things, a gaming floor featuring up to 1,500 slot machines, a seven-story hotel, and a four-level parking garage. The new racino is slated to open in the summer of 2008. In Biddeford, Maine on November 2, 2010 by a vote of 59%-41% approved a referendum to relocate Scarborough Downs to Biddeford with a new Harness Racing Track/Racino Complex with Slot Machines, an Entertainment Complex and a 200 room Hotel. The plan is to have most if not all of  the complex open sometime in 2012. Maine voters also approved the Oxford County Maine casino on Nov 2, 2010 also, the indications are that the Bangor Maine Racino and the possibly relocated Scarborough Downs Racino facility could also have table games as well.

There are two racino-like facilities in Arkansas. The Oaklawn Jockey Club Racing Track, a horse track, is in Hot Springs. Southland Park, a greyhound track, is in West Memphis.

References

External links 
Dictionary entry tracing the term back to 1995
Gambling drives passion for ponies, a June 2003 article from USA Today
Argument Over VLTs at Tracks Heats Up, a December 2003 article from the Detroit News

Casinos
Horse racing